Helen Loney is an archaeologist specialising in the study of prehistory. She is principal lecturer in archaeology and heritage studies at the University of Worcester, where she has worked since 2007. Between 1996 and 2007 Loney lectured at the University of Glasgow. She is chair of the Worcester branch of the University and College Union.

Loney has a number of roles with archaeology societies, including Deputy Chair of the Worcestershire Archaeological Society, council member of the Society for Post-Medieval Archaeology, and member of the editorial board for the Cumberland and Westmorland Antiquarian and Archaeological Society.

Education 
Loney studied a Bachelor of Arts in anthropology at the University of California, Santa Barbara, graduating magna cum laude in 1983. She went on to complete a Master of Arts and a Doctor of Philosophy at the University of Pennsylvania, finishing in 1995.

Career 
Loney worked as a lecturer in archaeology at the University of Glasgow between 1996 and 2007, before moving to the University of Worcester for the start of the 2007/08 academic year. In 2008/09, Loney and Andrew Hoaen received funding to radiocarbon-date material recovered during fieldwork at Matterdale.

In 2013 wrote the book Social Change and Technology in Prehistoric Italy, based on her PhD thesis. It was published by the Accordia Research Institute, and a review by Bob Chapman for the Prehistoric Society described it as a "welcome [addition] to the literature on later Italian prehistory".

References

External links 

 
 
 2019 interview about Loney's writing

Women archaeologists
21st-century American archaeologists
Year of birth missing (living people)
Living people
University of California, Santa Barbara alumni
University of Pennsylvania alumni
Academics of the University of Glasgow
Academics of the University of Worcester